The Junkers Jumo 213 was a World War II-era V-12 liquid-cooled aircraft engine, a development of Junkers Motoren's earlier design, the Jumo 211. The design added two features, a pressurized cooling system that required considerably less cooling fluid which allowed the engine to be built smaller and lighter, and a number of improvements that allowed it to run at higher RPM. These changes boosted power by over 500 hp and made the 213 one of the most sought-after Axis engine designs in the late-war era.

Design and development
When the Jumo 211 entered production in the late 1930s it used an unpressurized liquid cooling system based on an "open cycle". Water was pumped through the engine to keep it cool, but the system operated at atmospheric pressure, or only slightly higher. Since the boiling point of water decreases with altitude (pressure) this meant that the temperature of the cooling water had to be kept quite low to avoid boiling at high altitudes, which in turn meant that the water removed less heat from the engine before flowing into the radiator to cool it.

By contrast, the 1940 Daimler-Benz DB 601E used a pressurized coolant system that ran at the same pressure regardless of altitude, raising the boiling point to about 110 °C. This allowed it to use considerably less water for the same cooling effect, which remained the same at all altitudes. Although otherwise similar to the Jumo 210 in most respects, the 601 was smaller and lighter than the 211, and could be run at higher power settings at higher altitudes, making it popular in fighter designs. The 211 was relegated to "secondary" roles in bombers and transports.

The Junkers Motorenwerke firm was not happy with this state of affairs, and started its own efforts to produce a pressurized cooling system as early as 1938. Experiments on the 211 proved so successful that it became clear that not only could the engine be built smaller and lighter (by reducing the water requirement), but could be run at higher power settings without overheating. Additional changes to strengthen the crankshaft and add a fully shrouded supercharger for increased boost resulted in the Jumo 211F model, which delivered 1,340 PS (1,322 hp, 986 kW) at 2,600 RPM, up from 1000 PS at 2,200 RPM in the first version 211A.

But this was only the beginning. After redesigning the engine block to a smaller external size to suit the increased cooling power – while keeping the same 150 mm x 165 mm bore/stroke figures, maintaining the 35 litre displacement of the Jumo 211 series – and then further increasing boost settings on the supercharger, the resulting 213A model was able to deliver 1,750 PS (metric hp) at 3,250 RPM. This made it considerably more powerful than the corresponding DB 601E which provided 1,350 PS, and about the same power as the much larger DB 603  of 44.52 litre displacement. Junkers decided to go after the 603's market, and placed the 213's mounting points and fluid connections in the same locations as the 603, allowing it to be "dropped in" as a replacement, with the exception of the Jumo's standard starboard-side supercharger intake (Daimler-Benz inverted V12 engines always had the supercharger intakes on the port side).

The 213A (the main production series, with single-stage two-speed supercharging) first ran in 1940, but experienced lengthy delays before finally being declared "production quality" in 1943. Production was extremely slow to ramp up, in order to avoid delays in the existing Jumo 211 production. By the time the engines were available in any sort of number in 1944, Allied bombing repeatedly destroyed the production lines. Production of the A model was limited to about 400–500 a month for most of 1944/45.

A range of advanced versions were also developed during the lengthy teething period. The 213B was designed to run on 100 octane "C3" fuel, allowing the boost pressure to be increased and the take-off power improved to 2,000 PS. The 213C was essentially an A model with re-arranged secondary equipment (supercharger, oil pump, etc.) to allow a Motorkanone cannon to fire through the propeller shaft. The 213D added a new three-speed supercharger for smoother power curves and improved altitude performance, but it was not produced.

The next major production versions were the 213E and the similar 213F. These engines were equipped with a new two-speed, two-stage supercharger that dramatically improved altitude performance. The only difference between the two models was that the E included an intercooler for additional high-altitude performance, while the F model lacked this and was optimized for slightly lower altitudes. The E and F models were in high demand for many late-war aircraft, including the Junkers Ju 188, Junkers Ju 388, the Langnasen-Dora models of the Focke-Wulf Fw 190D and the Focke-Wulf Ta 152H. All of these aircraft used annular radiators characteristic of the earlier Jumo 211 engine installations on twin-engined aircraft, often standardized as Kraftei (power-egg), completely unitized power plant "modules" for any twin or multi-engined aircraft, much as the Jumo 211 had evolved for earlier aircraft designs – but with the annular radiators noticeably reconfigured for better cooling of the more powerful Jumo 213 engine.

A further substantial upgrade was projected as the 213J, which replaced the earlier model's three valves with a new four-valve-per-cylinder design for increased volumetric efficiency. It was also to have had a two-stage three-speed supercharger, producing  at 3700 rpm for take-off. There was no time to work this change into the production line before the war ended. Other experimental models included the 213S for low-altitude use, and the turbocharged 213T.

Further development of the Jumo 213 was carried out at Arsenal de l'Aéronautique in France after the Second World War.

Variants

213A First version, 1,750 PS (2,100 PS with MW50 boost) take-off power, major production version.
213B Project, a 213A with C3 fuel (100 octane) and up to 2,000 PS take-off power.
213C As 213A but equipped for mounting of a cannon firing through the propeller axis (Motorkanone), limited production.
213D 213C with a new three-speed supercharger, did not enter production.
213E High altitude version of 213A, equipped with a three-speed two-stage intercooled supercharger and delivering 1,750 PS take-off power (2,050 PS with MW 50 boost).
213FSimilar to the 213E, but without the intercooler.
213JProject, redesigned with four valves per-cylinder and a two-stage three-speed supercharger, delivering 2,380 PS at takeoff.
J13TProposed turbocharged variant.
Arsenal 12HPost-war development of the Junkers Jumo 213 which had been in production for the Germans at the Arsenal de l'Aéronautique factories.
Arsenal 12H-Tandem2x 12H engines in tandem driving co-axial propellers.
Arsenal 12KFurther development of the 12H.
Arsenal 24HA 24-cylinder H-24 engine utilizing 12H cylinder blocks, crankshafts and pistons mounted on a new crankcase driving a single propeller.
Arsenal 24H-Tandem2x 24H engines in tandem driving co-axial propellers.
SFECMAS 12H The Arsenal 12H after SFECMAS absorbed Arsenal.
SFECMAS 12K The Arsenal 12K after SFECMAS absorbed Arsenal.

Applications
 Heinkel He 111H-22
 Junkers Ju 88
 Junkers Ju 188
 Junkers Ju 388
 Focke-Wulf Fw 190D
 Focke-Wulf Ta 152
 Focke-Wulf Ta 154
 Messerschmitt Me 209-II
 Nord Noroit
 SNCASO SO.8000 Narval

Specifications (Jumo 213E)

See also

References

Notes

Bibliography

External links

 Jumo 213-powered Fw 190D engine startup video
 Enginehistory.org's Junkers Jumo 213 page

Junkers aircraft engines
1940s aircraft piston engines
Inverted V12 aircraft engines
Inverted aircraft piston engines